Mastigophallus is a genus of air-breathing land snails, terrestrial pulmonate gastropod mollusks in the subfamily Trissexodontinae of the family Trissexodontidae.

Species
 Mastigophallus rangianus (Michaud, 1831)
Species brought into synonymy
 † Mastigophallus patellinus (Oppenheim, 1890): synonym of † Paracanariella patellina (Oppenheim, 1890) 
 † Mastigophallus vialai [sic]: synonym of † Paracanariella vialaii (De Boissy, 1840)  (incorrect subsequent spelling)

References

 Bank, R. A. (2017). Classification of the Recent terrestrial Gastropoda of the World. Last update: July 16th, 2017

External links
 
 Hesse, P. (1918). Die Subfamilie Helicodontinae. Nachrichtsblatt der Deutschen Malakozoologischen Gesellschaft. 50 (3): 99-110. Frankfurt am Main

Trissexodontidae